The Most Hated Man on the Internet is a 2022 American three-part Netflix docuseries that covers the story of Hunter Moore and his website Is Anyone Up?, a pornographic site based on stolen and hacked photos, and the struggle to take the website down. It focuses on the story of Charlotte Laws as she tries to remove her daughter's nude photos from the website.

Overview 
The Most Hated Man on the Internet follows anti-revenge porn activists in their efforts to take down the website IsAnyoneUp.com. Created by Hunter Moore, the website was built so anyone can post a picture of anyone and connect it to their social media accounts. Charlotte Laws started a campaign to try to take it down after her daughter's nude photos were shared on the website.

The documentary is separated into three episodes. It is directed by Rob Miller, an employee of Netflix. The three episodes are made up of interviews of the main roles in the site except Hunter Moore. Hunter originally was willing to be featured and interviewed for the documentary but later declined for unknown reasons.

Reception
The Most Hated Man on the Internet received positive reviews. On the review aggregator website Rotten Tomatoes, the series has an approval rating of 86%, based on 14 reviews, with an average rating of 6.1/10. The website's consensus reads, "Focusing on a truly repellent real-life villain, The Most Hated Man on the Internets dive through some of the most sordid corners of the web is redeemed by a satisfying through line of justice served."

References

External links

2022 American television series debuts
2020s American documentary television series
American documentary television series about crime
English-language Netflix original programming
Netflix original documentary television series
Works about the Internet
Television series by All3Media